Carrara Academy may refer to:

 The Accademia Carrara di Belle Arti di Bergamo in Bergamo, Italy
 The Accademia di Belle Arti di Carrara, in Carrara, Tuscany, Italy